Shirley Dawn Cowles  (26 April 1939 – 5 March 2020) was a New Zealand cricketer who played as a right-handed batter and occasional wicket-keeper. She appeared in 7 Test matches and 5 One Day Internationals for New Zealand between 1969 and 1977. She played domestic cricket for Canterbury. In the 2003 New Year Honours, Cowles was appointed a Member of the New Zealand Order of Merit, for services to women's cricket.

References

External links
 
 

1939 births
2020 deaths
Cricketers from Christchurch
New Zealand women cricketers
New Zealand women Test cricketers
New Zealand women One Day International cricketers
Canterbury Magicians cricketers
Members of the New Zealand Order of Merit